Tso Lhamo lake is one of the highest lakes in the world, located at an altitude of . It is fed by waters from Zemu glacier, Kangtse glacier or Pauhunri glacier, and is the source of the Teesta river.

Joseph Dalton Hooker referred to the lake as Cholamoo lake. Its name is also spelled Chho Lhamo and Cholamu lake.

Geography
Tso Lhamo Lake is a glacial, fresh-water lake located northeast of the Kangchenjunga range in a high plateau area connected with the Tibetan Plateau. 

See also
 Tilicho lake
 Lake Tsongmo
 Khecheopalri Lake

References 

Lakes of Sikkim
Mangan district